The 1978–79 Inter-City League season was the first season of the Inter-City League, the top level ice hockey league in southern England. Eight teams participated in the league, and the Streatham Redskins won the championship. The top four teams qualified for the British Championship. The games played by Oxford University were counted double. (One win/loss is equivalent to two wins/losses.)

Regular season

External links
 Season on hockeyarchives.info

Inter
Inter-City League seasons